Digital Juice is a series of six Studio 4°C shorts collected in January 2002 as a direct-to-DVD package film. Each short is directed by a different director. The shorts deal with a variety of subjects, but they share an emphasis on psychological issues, fantasy, and mystery.

Overview

Lords of the Sword
A 2-minute and 9 second short directed by Hidekazu Ohara,  takes place in a town in the Muromachi era, and is characterized by intense action.

Chicken's Insurance
A 3-minute and 25 second short directed by Hiroaki Ando,  is a CGI animation about chickens and supposedly produced by chickens. The short features the vocal talents of Yūji Ueda who plays the role of Chicken.

Tojin Kit
A 31-second short directed by Tatsuyuki Tanaka,  represents a portion of preview footage for Tatsuyuki Tanaka's first original manga.

In the Evening of a Moonlit Night
A 4-minute and 26 second short,  represents the directorial debut of Kazuyoshi Yaginuma. A simple tale of a girl and two boys, the short is characterized by intense color.

Table & Fishman
A 5-minute and 18 second short directed by Osamu Kobayashi, "Table & Fishman" is a love story between a fish-man named Jack (Hisao Egawa) and his companion named Stefany (Yūko Nagashima). After coming upon a symbol for infinity, the two find themselves racing rapidly into the infinite. Along the way they encounter a bewildering variety of fellow travelers including the Great Western King (Hirofumi Tanaka), the Queen of Singer (Yuka Komatsu), the Mini Prince (Tomoko Kaneda), and the mysterious Samu (Keisaku Baba).

The Saloon in the Air
A 4-minute and 26 second short directed by Kôji Morimoto,  is set in a saloon floating high in the sky. The story is told from the perspective of Wine-chan and recounts a sequence of events that unfold one strange evening as a number of bizarre characters gather at the saloon. "Aerial Bar" is notably shot primarily in live-action instead of animation as Morimoto is known for.

References

External links
 Official Homepage at Studio 4°C
 
 

2002 anime OVAs
Studio 4°C
Films directed by Kōji Morimoto
Anime film and television articles using incorrect naming style